In geometry, a pleated surface is roughly a surface that may have simple folds but is not crumpled in more complicated ways. More precisely, a pleated surface is an isometry from a complete hyperbolic surface S to a hyperbolic 3-fold such that every point of S is in the interior of a geodesic that is mapped to a geodesic.

The Universal Book of Mathematics provides the following information about pleated surfaces:

It is a surface in Euclidean  space or  hyperbolic  space that  resembles  a polyhedron in the  sense  that  it  has  flat  faces  that  meet  along  edges. Unlike  a  polyhedron,  a  pleated  surface  has  no  corners, but it may have infinitely many edges that form a lamination.

References

Hyperbolic geometry
3-manifolds